Abidullah Taniwal (born 23 January 2002) is an Afghan cricketer. He made his first-class debut for Kabul Region in the 2019 Ahmad Shah Abdali 4-day Tournament on 29 April 2019, taking a five-wicket haul in the first innings. In December 2019, he was named in Afghanistan's squad for the 2020 Under-19 Cricket World Cup. He made his List A debut on 15 October 2021, for Boost Region in the 2021 Ghazi Amanullah Khan Regional One Day Tournament.

References

External links
 

2002 births
Living people
Afghan cricketers
Boost Defenders cricketers
Kabul Eagles cricketers
Place of birth missing (living people)